Cansjera is a genus of plants in the family Opiliaceae described as a genus with this name in 1789.

Cansjera is native to southern China, Indian Subcontinent, Southeast Asia, Papuasia, and northern Australia.

Species
 Cansjera leptostachya - Java, Lesser Sunda Is, Maluku, New Guinea, Solomons, Bismarck, N Australia (NT Qld WA)
 Cansjera parvifolia - Myanmar
 Cansjera rheedei - India, Sri Lanka, Nepal, China (Guangdong, Guangxi, Hainan, Yunnan), Andaman & Nicobar, Indochina, P Malaysia, Borneo, Sumatra, Philippines

References

Opiliaceae
Santalales genera